Momofuku is a culinary brand established by chef David Chang in 2004 with the opening of Momofuku Noodle Bar. It includes restaurants in New York City, Toronto, Las Vegas, and Los Angeles (Noodle Bar, Ssäm Bar, Ko, Má Pêche (defunct), Seiōbo, Noodle Bar Toronto, Kōjin, Fuku, Fuku+, CCDC, Nishi, Ando, Las Vegas, Fuku Wall St, Kāwi), a bakery established by pastry chef Christina Tosi (Milk Bar), a bar (Nikai), and a quarterly magazine (Lucky Peach). The restaurants are notable for their innovative take on cuisine while supporting local, sustainable and responsible farmers and food purveyors.

Chang has written that the name "Momofuku" is "an indirect nod" to Momofuku Ando, the Japanese-Taiwanese inventor of instant ramen. Chang has suggested it is not an accident that he chose a word that sounds similar to the curse word "motherfucker".

History 
With experience in restaurants in New York City, Chef David Chang opened up his first restaurant in 2004, Momofuku Noodle Bar. It was influenced by his time spent working in Japan and visiting ramen shops. After about a year of trials, Noodle Bar took off as a success when the chefs began cooking what they felt like — more adventurous dishes with better ingredients. Growing, Noodle Bar eventually moved up the street, and Momofuku Ko took over the space.

Momofuku Ssäm Bar opened after Noodle Bar and originally had the concept of an Asian-style burrito bar (ssam is Korean for wrap). After experiencing troubles, Chang and his cohorts decided to change the style of the menu, away from the burrito-centered cuisine. This change led Ssäm Bar to success, as it received two stars (eventually three) from The New York Times.

The third restaurant to open was Momofuku Ko. Chang describes the idea behind Ko as a "cook-centric restaurant with just a few stools, a collaborative kitchen, and a constantly changing menu." Má Pêche was the fourth restaurant to open and the first to open outside of the East Village neighborhood.

Momofuku Seiōbo in October 2011 was the first restaurant to open outside of the U.S. In January 2012, Momofuku opened the cocktail bar Booker & Dax in the back of Ssäm Bar in collaboration with Dave Arnold. Momofuku Toronto followed in 2012 alongside the opening of the Shangri-La Hotel. Fuku, a chicken sandwich restaurant, opened in the original Noodle Bar location in June 2015.

Doing office work for Ssäm Bar at the time, pastry chef Christina Tosi began the desserts program at the three Momofuku restaurants, first at Ssäm Bar, then Noodle Bar, and then Ko.

The first Momofuku Milk Bar started in the laundromat next to Ssäm Bar. After a year and a half, a second Milk Bar opened in Midtown, in the Chambers Hotel. In November 2010 the Williamsburg, Brooklyn kitchen opened to accommodate the growth of Milk Bar. On September 24, 2011, Milk Bar opened its fourth location on the Upper West Side of Manhattan. In March 2012, Milk Bar opened a fifth location in Carroll Gardens, Brooklyn, and its most recent, sixth, location opened in SOHO in September 2014.

In April 2018, Momofuku signed a deal with Kraft Heinz to start selling their chili sauce in American grocery stores.

Restaurants 

Momofuku Noodle Bar was the first Momofuku restaurant; it opened in August 2004. It serves ramen, seasonal dishes, and a variety of buns.

Since opening in 2006, Momofuku Ssäm Bar has been listed as one of The World's 50 Best Restaurants for 2009, 2010, 2011, 2012. Weekday lunches feature an all-rotisserie duck menu. Booker and Dax (the bar at Ssäm) is open late serving drinks made with new techniques and technologies.

Momofuku Ko opened in March 2008. At Momofuku Ko (ko means "child of"), guests sit along a kitchen counter and are served by the cooks. Dinner is a set tasting menu devised by the chef, Sean Gray, and his aides-de-cuisine. It is usually about 10 courses long; at lunch the menu stretches out to 16 courses. Since opening in 2008, Momofuku Ko has earned two Michelin stars, which it has retained for eleven years. Ko is No. 70 on the San Pellegrino World's Best Restaurants list.

Má Pêche ("mother peach") is in Midtown Manhattan in the Chambers Hotel. Má Pêche opened in 2010 with co-owner and executive chef, Tien Ho, with Chef Paul Carmichael taking the reins in October 2011. This change prompted a shift in Má Pêche's cuisine from French-Vietnamese to American. Má Pêche includes a midtown outpost of Christina Tosi's bakery, Momofuku Milk Bar.

Fuku is a casual chicken concept by Momofuku. Originally started as a fried chicken sandwich joint, Fuku has since grown to serve various chicken and seasonal offerings, along with beer, slushies, and more. Fuku has locations in the East Village, Wall St, Madison Square Garden, Citi Field, T-Mobile Park in Seattle, and the Seaport in South Boston.

Seiōbo is Momofuku's first restaurant outside of New York City. In Sydney, it opened at The Star Casino in late October 2011. "Seiōbo" is the Japanese pronunciation for the traditional Chinese "goddess of the West", who is known in mythical stories, such as Journey to the West, as owning the celestial peach orchards. Momofuku Seiōbo has two hats from The Sydney Morning Herald Good Food Guide and was named Best New Restaurant.

In 2012, David Chang opened Momofuku Toronto, Momofuku's first location in Canada. It is in a three-story glass cube on University Avenue in Downtown Toronto and is home to Noodle Bar, Nikai, Daishō and Shōtō.

Noodle Bar is on the ground floor and is a sister-restaurant to the one the same name in New York City. The menu features bowls of ramen and a roster of dishes like steamed buns and rice cakes. The restaurant is home to a custom piece of art created by Steve Keene.
Nikai is a bar and lounge on the second floor of Momofuku Toronto. The menu features cocktails, beer, wine, and sake. Guests can order items from both the Noodle Bar and Daishō menus.
Daishō is on the third floor. The menu features large-format meals meant for parties of 4–10 guests and an à la carte menu that includes dishes to share. Shōtō is in the Daishō dining room on the third floor. Shōtō serves a roughly 10-course tasting menu that is based on market availability. Guests are seated along the counter and served by the chefs.

Chang opened Momofuku CCDC, his first restaurant in the Washington, D.C. area in October 2015 in the downtown CityCenterDC development. The restaurant included a Milkbar location.
The location closed permanently in 2020 as part of a larger restructuring.

Momofuku Milk Bar, under the direction of pastry chef Christina Tosi, is based in New York City and has several locations in the cities of Washington and Toronto.

Momofuku Nishi (which means "west") opened in January 2016 and is Momofuku's first restaurant on the west side. In New York City's Chelsea neighborhood, guests can choose from à la carte offerings for lunch or dinner.

Momofuku Las Vegas is Momofuku's first restaurant in the western U.S. It is inside of The Cosmopolitan of Las Vegas. The menu draws influence from all over the world, including the U.S., Korea, and Japan. The constantly evolving menu features steamed buns, noodles, and meat and seafood meant for sharing.

Publications

 
In 2009, David Chang, Peter Meehan, Gabriele Stabile and the Momofuku team produced the Momofuku cookbook. It features recipes and photographs from Momofuku Noodle Bar, Momofuku Ssam Bar, Momofuku Ko, and Milk Bar. The cookbook was a New York Times Best Seller.

Written by Christina Tosi with a foreword by David Chang, the Momofuku Milk Bar cookbook was released in October 2011. Christina Tosi included her recipes for Cereal Milk, Crack Pie, the Compost Cookie, and other popular Milk Bar desserts.

Scraps is a limited edition collection of outtakes and artwork from the Momofuku cookbook photographer, Gabriele Stabile.

Lucky Peach 
From 2011 to November 2013, Lucky Peach, a quarterly journal of food writing, was published by McSweeney's. Since then, it has been self-published. Lucky Peach was then created by David Chang, Peter Meehan, and Zero Point Zero production.

The first issue of Lucky Peach centered on ramen. The second issue, "The Sweet Spot", included articles on the neurobiology of how the brain detects sweet foods. This issue was a New York Times Best Seller. The third issue, "Chefs and Cooks", was also a New York Times Best Seller.

The fourth issue of Lucky Peach was about American food. The fifth issue was about Chinatown and was released in November 2012. The sixth issue was centered on the theme of the apocalypse and was published in January 2013. The seventh issue of Lucky Peach was about travel. Released in May 2013, the issue featured one of Christopher Boffoli's "Big Appetites" photographs as its cover image. The eighth issue centered on the idea of gender in the food world.

In March 2017, Lucky Peach announced it would cease publication after printing a double issue in the fall of 2017. Meehan stated that the shuttering of the publication was due to its partners' differences in creative direction and financial strategy.

Awards and honors 
 2009, 2010, 2011, 2012, 2013 San Pellegrino World's 50 Best Restaurants: Momofuku Ssam Bar
 2011, 2012, 2013 San Pellegrino World's 50 Best Restaurants: Momofuku Ko
 2011, 2012, 2013, 2014 Michelin Guide: Momofuku Ssäm Bar and Momofuku Noodle Bar, Michelin Bib Gourmands Guide to NYC
 2008 James Beard Awards: David Chang (momofuku ssäm bar), Best Chef New York City
 2009 New York Magazine Where to Eat Momofuku Ko and Momofuku Milk Bar
 2009 James Beard Awards: Momofuku Ko, Best New Restaurant New York City
 2009 Zagat Survey: Momofuku Ko, Best Newcomer
2009 Michelin Guide: Momofuku Ko, 2 Stars
 2010 Time Out New York Eat Out Awards: Momofuku Noodle Bar, Best Fried Chicken
 2011 Time Out New York Food and Drink Awards: David Chang, Empire Builder of the Year
 2011 James Beard Awards: Christina Tosi (Momofuku Milk Bar), Rising Star Chef of the Year (nominated)
 2011 New York Magazine: Momofuku Ko, The Five Most Influential Restaurants of the Past Six Years
 2012 James Beard Awards: Christina Tosi (Momofuku Milk Bar), Rising Star Chef of the Year
 2012 James Beard Awards: David Chang (Momofuku Ssäm Bar), Outstanding Chef (nominated)
 2012 Time Out Sydney: Momofuku Seiōbo, Restaurant of the Year 2012
 2013 James Beard Awards: David Chang (Momofuku Noodle Bar), Outstanding Chef
 2013 Bon Appétit: Momofuku Restaurant Group, most important restaurant in America
 2013 Toronto Life: Momofuku Shōtō, Best New Toronto Restaurants, #1
 2013 Toronto Life: Momofuku Daishō, Best New Toronto Restaurants, #3
 2013 Gourmet Traveller: Momofuku Seiōbō, Restaurant of the Year
 2014 James Beard Awards: David Chang (Momofuku), Who's Who in Food & Beverage

See also

 List of noodle restaurants
 Momofuku Ando
Japanese cuisine
Korean cuisine

References

Further reading
 Food & Wine Interview with Best New Chef David Chang
 Richman, Alan. "Year of the Pig", GQ Magazine, December 2007
 Chef on the Edge article in The New Yorker
 Award-Winning David Chang Revealed. Washington Post, October 7, 2009
 'iPad App or Magazine? A Chef Orders One of Each', Kimberly Chou, The Wall Street Journal, June 14, 2011

External links 
 

Restaurants in New South Wales
Restaurants in New York City
Restaurants in Toronto
Restaurants established in 2004
Ramen shops
Heinz brands
2004 establishments in New York City